Callobius is a genus of tangled nest spiders first described by R. V. Chamberlin in 1947.

Species 
 it contains thirty-one species with a holarctic distribution:

Callobius amamiensis Okumura, Honki & Ohba, 2018 – Japan
Callobius angelus (Chamberlin & Ivie, 1947) – USA
Callobius arizonicus (Chamberlin & Ivie, 1947) – USA, Mexico
Callobius balcanicus (Drensky, 1940) – Bulgaria
Callobius bennetti (Blackwall, 1846) – USA, Canada
Callobius canada (Chamberlin & Ivie, 1947) – USA, Canada
Callobius claustrarius (Hahn, 1833) – Europe, Turkey, Caucasus to Kazakhstan
Callobius deces (Chamberlin & Ivie, 1947) – USA
Callobius enus (Chamberlin & Ivie, 1947) – USA, Canada
Callobius gertschi Leech, 1972 – USA
Callobius guachama Leech, 1972 – USA
Callobius hokkaido Leech, 1971 – Russia (Kurile Is.), Japan
Callobius hyonasus Leech, 1972 – USA
Callobius kamelus (Chamberlin & Ivie, 1947) – USA
Callobius klamath Leech, 1972 – USA
Callobius koreanus (Paik, 1966) – Korea
Callobius manzanita Leech, 1972 – USA
Callobius nevadensis (Simon, 1884) – USA
Callobius nomeus (Chamberlin, 1919) – USA, Canada
Callobius olympus (Chamberlin & Ivie, 1947) – USA
Callobius panther Leech, 1972 – USA
Callobius paskenta Leech, 1972 – USA
Callobius pauculus Leech, 1972 – USA
Callobius paynei Leech, 1972 – USA
Callobius pictus (Simon, 1884) – USA, Canada
Callobius rothi Leech, 1972 – USA
Callobius severus (Simon, 1884) – USA, Canada
Callobius sierra Leech, 1972 – USA
Callobius tamarus (Chamberlin & Ivie, 1947) – USA
Callobius tehama Leech, 1972 – USA
Callobius yakushimensis Okumura, 2010 – Japan

References 

Amaurobiidae
Spiders of Asia
Spiders of North America
Araneomorphae genera
Taxa named by Ralph Vary Chamberlin